The 1994 European Beach Volleyball Championships were held in August, 1994 men's in Almería, Spain and women's in Espinho, Portugal. It was the second official edition of the men's event, which started in 1993, while the women competed for the first time.

Men's competition

Women's competition

References
 Results

1994
E
B
1994